Hafei Aviation Industry Co Ltd is a Chinese manufacturer of light airplanes, helicopters and aerospace parts. While located in Harbin, Heilongjiang Province the company also has a presence in Beijing.

Hafei Aviation is a publicly traded subsidiary of the Harbin Aviation Industry (Group) Co Ltd,  a company that also has a joint venture with Airbus to make A320 composite materials components and work on the A350 XWB.

References

External links
Hafei Official Page 
The New EC 120 Assembly Line in China Heralds a Step Forward in terms of Co-operation between Eurocopter, CATIC and Hafei Aviation Industry Co. Ltd. EADS
Chinese to Partner on Boeing Airplanes, 7E7 Dreamliner Boeing

Aerospace companies of China